Compromising Daphne is a 1930 British comedy film directed by Thomas Bentley and starring Jean Colin, Phyllis Konstam, C. M. Hallard and Viola Compton. It was also released under the alternative title Compromised! and was based on a play by Edith Fitzgerald. The film was produced by the leading British company of the era British International Pictures at their Elstree Studios with sets designed by John Mead.

Plot
A young couple struggle with their overbearing parents.

Cast
Jean Colin as Daphne Ponsonby
Charles Hickman as George
Phyllis Konstam as Sadie Bannister
C. M. Hallard as Mr Ponsonby
Viola Compton as Mrs Ponsonby
Leo Sheffield as Mr Bannister
Frank Perfitt as Hicks
Barbara Gott as Martha
Margot Grahame as Muriel

References

External links

1930 films
1930s English-language films
1930 comedy films
British comedy films
Films shot at British International Pictures Studios
Films directed by Thomas Bentley
British films based on plays
British black-and-white films
Silent comedy films
1930s British films